Lemyra melanochroa is a moth of the family Erebidae. It was described by George Hampson in 1918. It is found in southern India (Tamil Nadu: Nilgiris).

References

 

melanochroa
Moths described in 1918